Scooby-Doo and the Alien Invaders is a 2000 American direct-to-video animated science fiction romantic comedy mystery film. It is the third direct-to-video film based on Scooby-Doo Saturday morning cartoons. The film was produced by Hanna-Barbera. It is the third of the first four Scooby-Doo direct-to-video films to be animated overseas by Japanese animation studio Mook Animation. Unlike the previous films and despite the grimmer atmosphere, it has a lighter tone since the real monsters are on Mystery Inc.'s side and the disguised humans are the main villians.

It was the last film to feature Mary Kay Bergman as the voice of Daphne, following her untimely death by suicide on November 11, 1999, the film is dedicated in her memory. It is also the last film to use cel animation, as starting with Scooby-Doo and the Cyber Chase, the film's would use digital ink and paint.

Plot
At the SALF station, Max, Laura and Steve suddenly get a loud reading that is off the charts. When it disappears, Steve gets something on the radar.

The Mystery Machine is driving through a desert. During a sandstorm, Shaggy accidentally makes a turn into government property, and a subsequent sighting of a UFO causes him to lose control and crash into a cactus, denting the front and severely damaging the radiator. The gang find themselves on the outskirts of a small town. While Scooby-Doo and Shaggy stay with the van, the rest of the gang walks to the town, where they ask for help at a diner. While waiting, Shaggy and Scooby fight over a Scooby Snack before encountering a fictional animal called a jackalope. When they chase it into the mouth of a cave, they see a glow in the distance. Two aliens then approach them from behind and chase them towards the town.

Shaggy and Scooby run into the diner in panic, claiming to have seen aliens. The diner waitress, Dottie, says that they have never seen aliens, but do see strange lights and hear strange sounds at night. The chef, Sergio, says that cattle have also vanished overnight without a trace and people left town as a result. A man named Lester claims to have been abducted once before and claims that he has pictures. The gang goes to his house to see them, but they turn out to be nothing more than paintings by Lester. Lester then offers to let the gang stay for the night.

While sleeping on the roof, Scooby and Shaggy are abducted. They attempt to escape but are surrounded by the aliens. They find themselves in the middle of the desert the following morning after being awakened by a hippy photographer, Crystal, and her golden retriever, Amber. Scooby and Shaggy fall head over heels in love the moment they lay eyes on them. Crystal gives them a ride back to the diner, but they are so smitten that they have no appetite, much to the shock of the rest of the gang. The gang go to the grouchy local mechanic to ask if he can fix their vehicle. They then meet Max before Crystal and Amber reappear. Curious about the jackalope, Crystal asks Shaggy to show her where they saw it. Shaggy is more than happy to do so and heads off with Scooby in tow.

Max takes Velma, Fred and Daphne to meet the other SALF crew. Velma becomes suspicious when she sees dried mud on their boots since they are in the desert. Later, she decides to take the gang to a canyon where she presumes a river might run. The canyon proves to be dry, but they find mining equipment and gold in the nearby caves. Meanwhile, military police order Shaggy, Crystal, Scooby-Doo and Amber to leave the area as its government property. Crystal then tells Shaggy she is actually an undercover government agent and wants to go back to investigate. Shaggy leads them to the cave where he first saw the aliens. They hide inside when the MPs come back but are able to trick them into leaving by pretending that Scooby's tail is a snake. A real snake then scares Shaggy and Scooby into going further into the cave, with Crystal and Amber close behind. They also discover the gold but are found and chased by the aliens and the MPs, running into the rest of the gang in the process.

Fred, Velma and Daphne are trapped in a net while the others fall off a ledge after being cornered by the MPs. After the aliens send the MPs after them, it is revealed that the aliens are actually the SALF crew, who explain that they stumbled upon the cave while searching for the ground to place another SALF dish. Since it was on government property, they decided not to report it, and plan to keep it that way. They hired fake MPs, disguised a helicopter as a UFO and created a UFO interior out of a movie set to scare the locals away from their operation.

When the MPs corner the others at another ledge, Shaggy and Scooby try to chase them off, but Crystal and Amber scare them away by revealing their true alien forms. When they return to the others, Crystal and Amber again reveal their alien forms to everyone present and trap Max and the MPs by wrapping a metal beam around them. Laura and Steve try to capture them, but Shaggy and Scooby come to their rescue and Fred traps Laura and Steve under a net.

Crystal and Amber explain that they are aliens from a distant planet and disguised themselves as hippies because their information on Earth was from TV signals from the 1960s. It also turns out that the UFO that ran the gang off the road at the start of the film was actually Crystal and Amber's ship, which SALF had tracked. Crystal and Amber have to return to their home planet, but they share a heartfelt goodbye with Shaggy and Scooby.

The SALF crew are arrested by the authorities and are imprisoned for life with no trial. The mechanic arrives with the repaired Mystery Machine.
A heartbroken Shaggy and Scooby are instantly cheered up at the sight of a box of Scooby Snacks and the gang drives off as the jackalope watches them.

Voice cast
 Scott Innes as Scooby-Doo and Shaggy Rogers
 Mary Kay Bergman as Daphne Blake
 Frank Welker as Fred Jones
 B.J. Ward as Velma Dinkley
 Jeff Bennett as Lester and Fake MP #2
 Jennifer Hale as Dottie
 Mark Hamill as Steve and Agent
 Candi Milo as Crystal and Amber
 Kevin Michael Richardson as Max and Aliens
 Neil Ross as Sergio, Buck, and Fake MP #1
 Audrey Wasilewski as Laura
 Tress MacNeille as Dot Warner (Cameo)

Production
Scooby-Doo direct-to-video films began with Scooby-Doo on Zombie Island in 1998, followed by Witch's Ghost in 1999. The first films had done so well that the studio considered Scooby-Doo a tentpole property that would sell "no matter what". Witch's Ghost had a troubled production, with studio executives insisting the team follow a script written by outside screenwriters that the crew considered unsatisfactory. Unlike its predecessor, Alien Invaders was a largely smooth-sailing production, with little executive oversight. The film was written by Davis Doi and Lance Falk, with Glenn Leopold contributing small elements.

Reception
On Rotten Tomatoes it received an approval rating of 80% based on reviews from 5 critics. 
David Parkinson of Radio Times, gave the film a three out of five stars, saying, "This cartoon adventure is the best of a spate of feature-length spin-offs from the much-loved TV series." Common Sense Media gave the film a three out of five stars.

References

External links

 
 

2000 films
2000 animated films
2000 direct-to-video films
2000s American animated films
2000s monster movies
American children's animated comic science fiction films
American children's animated mystery films
Animated films about extraterrestrial life
2000s English-language films
Films directed by Jim Stenstrum
Films scored by Louis Febre
Warner Bros. Animation animated films
Warner Bros. direct-to-video animated films
Films set in New Mexico
Scooby-Doo direct-to-video animated films
Films about shapeshifting
2000s children's animated films